McKenzie Lake is a lake in the Unorganized Part of Rainy River District in northwestern Ontario, Canada. It is part of the Hudson Bay drainage basin, and lies within Quetico Provincial Park.

The primary inflows are Ferguson Creek at the northwest, arriving from Ferguson Lake, and an unnamed creek at the northeast. The primary outflow is an unnamed creek at the southwest which flows to McKenzie Bay on Kawnipi Lake. Kawnipi Lake drains via the Maligne River, the Namakan River, the Rainy River, the Winnipeg River and the Nelson River to Hudson Bay.

See also
List of lakes in Ontario

References

Lakes of Rainy River District